Teachers Village is a neighborhood centered around Halsey Street in Newark, New Jersey. It is located in Downtown Newark in southwest quadrant of the Four Corners Historic District, south of Market Street (SoMa) in the Central Ward between the Prudential Center and Springfield/Belmont.

Teachers Village was originally developed by RBH and was designed by Newark native son Richard Meier. The  eight-building, 400,000-square-foot project transformed five blocks in the city, resulting in 204 moderately priced apartments, three charter schools, open space and 65,000 square feet of retail space.

Ground was broken in 2012. Some buildings though more than 100 years old, were considered expendable in the greater development planning. To that end the demolition and replacement of some lead to the creation of a retail corridor along Halsey Street. Goldman Sachs committed $100 million to the project. It was completed in 2018.

The project has stimulated other new construction and renovations in the neighborhood such as the mixed-use buildings, the William Flats, the approved 19-story Vibe and the planned 40-story Halo. as well as new restaurants, shops, bank, and a planned Eataly-style food marketplace. At Washington and William Street a former office building is being heightened and transformed to residences.

Teachers Village is the core of a broader redevelopment for the district called SoMa, short for south of Market Street. The master plan calls for more than 15 million square feet of development area across 23 acres in the neighborhood.

References

External links 

Neighborhoods in Newark, New Jersey
Richard Meier buildings
2012 establishments in New Jersey